| cinematography = Pier Luigi Santi
| editing        = Klaus Kinski
| studio         = 
| distributor    = Medusa Distribuzione
| released       =   	
| runtime        = 81 minutes
| country        = 
| language       = Italian
}}
Kinski Paganini, also known simply as Paganini, is a 1989 biographical film written, directed by and starring Klaus Kinski. Based on the life and career of composer and virtuoso violinist Niccolò Paganini, it was Kinski's final film before his death in 1991.

The film also stars Kinski's young wife Debora Kinski and son Nikolai alongside him. Kinski felt that he and Paganini had led similar lives, and both gave "demonic" performances in their own fields that often sparked great controversy.

Plot 
A biopic about the life of Niccolò Paganini, who many consider to be one of the greatest violinists who ever lived.

Cast 
 Klaus Kinski as Niccolò Paganini
 Debora Kinski as Antonia Bianchi
 Nicolai Kinski as Achille Paganini
 Dalila Di Lazzaro as Helene von Feuerbach
 Tosca D'Aquino as Angiolina Cavanna
 Eva Grimaldi as Maria Anna Elisa Bonaparte
 Donatella Rettore as Miss Wells
 Bernard Blier as Father Caffarelli

Production
In his 1999 documentary My Best Fiend, frequent collaborator Werner Herzog explains that Kinski repeatedly asked him to direct the film, but Herzog refused because he thought the script was "unfilmable". Herzog also states that the preparation for his role in Kinski Paganini caused the actor to take on an uncomfortable "alien" air that disrupted Kinski's performance in their last film together, Cobra Verde.

Tosca D'Aquino recalled with shock her experience in the film: "I suffered the harassment of Kinski's very difficult nature. Going back I would not make this film because I suffered a lot. He was a very violent man. I had a complicated relationship, he was bossy, I had bruises." In his autobiography, Kinski, describing one of these scenes with D'Aquino, wrote, "She was embarrassed and closed her legs. I had to block them violently. When I penetrated her with my fingers, she squirmed and moaned."

Home media 
Since its theatrical run, the film had only been released on DVD and VHS in Germany, but in late 2011, the film was released for the first time in North America on a two disc special edition DVD. The release contained deleted and extended scenes, Cannes Film Festival interviews, and a director's cut (95 minutes).

References

External links 
 

1989 films
1989 directorial debut films
1980s Italian-language films
1980s biographical drama films
Biographical films about musicians
Cultural depictions of Niccolò Paganini
Films about classical music and musicians
Films about composers
Films about violins and violinists
Films directed by Klaus Kinski
Films set in the 19th century
Italian biographical drama films
French biographical drama films